Michael Bugan (born 28 June 1987) is a Slovakian equestrian athlete. He competed at the European Dressage Championships in 2019 in Rotterdam, as first Slovakian dressage rider. In 2017 he competed with two horses at the World Breeding Championships for Young Horses in Ermelo.

Bugan was qualified to participate at the Olympic Games in Tokyo, Japan, but the horse was not registered according the official Olympic rules, whereby the owner of the horse should be the same as the riders nationality.

References

1987 births
Living people
Slovakian male equestrians
Slovakian dressage riders
Sportspeople from Bratislava